Altens is a district in the city of Aberdeen, on the north-east coast of Scotland.

Altens is home to a large industrial estate, alongside a similar estate in neighbouring Tullos. The industrial estates have offices, including a large facility built for Royal Dutch Shell, as well as industrial units of various sizes, including the Royal Mail's main mail centre for the North East of Scotland.  There are also warehouses, car dealerships, and a civic amenity site.

The area is also home to one of three North East Scotland College campuses in Aberdeen City.

The industrial estate is home to Grampian Continental headquarters and a depot for RTH Lubbers UK. These two companies have depots in England and the Netherlands.

References

Areas of Aberdeen
Business parks of Scotland
Economy of Aberdeen